Raby Abdulmasih George (born 13 February 1992) is a Swedish footballer who plays as a midfielder for Enhörna IF.

Career 
Raby George made his Allsvenskan debut for Syrianska FC in 2011, coming on as a substitute for Nahir Oyal against Helsingborgs IF in the 88th minute.

He left Syrianska FC in August of the following year to enroll at the University of North Carolina at Chapel Hill as a student-athlete, earning a North Carolina Tar Heels soccer scholarship. He played four seasons with North Carolina Tar Heels men's soccer, scoring 10 goals in 85 appearances. While attending UNC, he also played for the U23 team of the National Premier Soccer League club Carolina Railhawks. George spent the 2016 season playing for the Georgia Revolution FC in the NPSL.

When returning to Sweden in 2016, he signed with Enhörna IF.

Personal life 
Raby George is good friends with Chicago Fire defender Jonathan Campbell, whom he befriended while a student-athlete at UNC. George graduated with a Bachelor of Science degree in Economics from UNC in 2016.

References

External links
 (archive)
 (archive)

1992 births
Living people
Swedish people of Assyrian/Syriac descent
Syrianska FC players
Syrian expatriate sportspeople in the United States
Allsvenskan players
Expatriate soccer players in the United States
Syrian footballers
University of North Carolina at Chapel Hill alumni
Swedish expatriate footballers
Assyriska FF players
Swedish footballers
Hammarby Fotboll players
Association football midfielders
Swedish expatriate sportspeople in the United States
Swedish people of Syrian descent
Georgia Revolution FC players
Assyrian footballers
People from Södertälje
Sportspeople from Stockholm County